La Maternelle (International title: Children of Montmartre) is a 1933 French film directed and written by Jean Benoît-Lévy and Marie Epstein. It was adapted from Léon Frapié's Prix Goncourt winning novel La Maternelle (1904). In 1935, it was ranked as the 6th best foreign film by the National Board of Review of Motion Pictures, and has received a 7.3 ranking (out of 10) by 71 reviewers at the Internet Movie Database.

Plot 
Rose, a girl from a well off family faces a series of tragic events that leaves her penniless and without a home. She is hired as an attendant at a day-care center in Paris with 150 poor children. She finds herself tenderly caring for them and soon they become very fond of her. One young girl named Marie, who is the abandoned daughter of a prostitute, becomes so attached to Rose that she becomes jealous when anyone else steals Rose's attention. Marie even tries to kill herself when she learns of  Rose's plans to marry Dr. Libois, the school's physician. Despite this, La Maternelle ultimately finds its way to a happy ending.

Cast
 Madeleine Renaud - Rose
 Mady Berry - Mme. Paulin
 Alice Tissot - Superintendent
 Paulette Elambert - Marie Coeuret
 Henri Debain - Dr. Libois
 Edmond van Daele - Pantin
 Alex Bernard - Professor

Critical reviews
In 1935, the New York Times called it "a film of extraordinary insight, tenderness and tragic beauty", adding "Mr. Benoit-Levy presents a heart-breaking cross-section of this tatterdemalion kindergarten in such minor portraits as the little boy who has never learned how to smile."

Also known as
Children of Montmartre: International (English title)
La maternelle: Italy (dubbed version)
Moderhaender: Denmark
Mutterhände: Germany

References 

1933 films
French black-and-white films
Films based on French novels